Launkalne parish is an administrative unit of Smiltene Municipality, Latvia. Prior to the 2009 administrative reforms it was a part of Valka District.

Towns, villages and settlements of Launkalne parish

References 

Parishes of Latvia
Smiltene Municipality